Słomków may refer to the following places in Poland:

 Słomków, Łódź Voivodeship
 Słomków, Masovian Voivodeship